The Streatham Campus in Exeter, Devon, is the largest campus of the University of Exeter. The centre of the campus is occupied by teaching, administrative and service buildings.  Most of the university's student halls of residence, and some accommodation for postgraduates and families, are on its edges.

Facilities
The campus has a student medical centre, supermarket, a counselling service, a children's day-care centre, a careers service and numerous catering outlets. Many halls of residence and some self-catering accommodation are located on this campus or in the near vicinity. In 2005 Streatham Campus's newest building, the Xfi centre, was completed to provide facilities mainly (but not exclusively) for postgraduate study in finance and investment.

The main bar on the campus, called "Ram", is situated in Devonshire house. The bar has an old feel to it with a beer garden outside. Cornwall House also has a bar, formerly called the "Ewe" which is part of the Lemon Grove (or "Lemmy" for short), the student nightclub. Both of these facilities are run by the Students' Guild. The postgraduate centre, Clydesdale House also has catering facilities and a bar. Clydesdale house also hosts social events organised by the Postgraduate Society.

Architecture
The campus is not as noted for its architecture as it is for its landscaping, since many of its buildings date from the period of rapid UK university expansion in the 1960s and 1970s when cost considerations dominated.  Architecturally the most interesting buildings are those that date from before or after this period, including Reed Hall (the 19th century Italianate mansion of the former owners of the Streatham Estate), and the Institute of Arab and Islamic Studies and Xfi (both from the 2000s).  The University College's original architect, Vincent Harris, had a master plan for a ring of buildings rising from Washington Singer, but this was realised only in part; apart from Washington Singer, the only buildings he was responsible for are: Roborough (originally the University College's library), Hatherly (designed in the 1930s but not built until the 1950s), the Mary Harris Memorial Chapel, and Mardon Hall, the first student residence built on the campus.  Sir Basil Spence was the architect of the Physics building.

Buildings
Most of the teaching and administrative buildings on the Streatham campus are named after benefactors or former officers of the university.  Major buildings, with their primary uses, include:

Academic buildings
Amory (School of Geography, Archaeology and Earth Resources; School of Humanities and Social Sciences; School of Law), named after Viscount Amory, former Chancellor
Geoffrey Pope (School of Biosciences), named after a former Chair of the University's Council
Great Hall
Harrison (School of Engineering, Mathematics and Physical Sciences), named after a former Vice-Chancellor
Hatherly (School of Biosciences)
Institute of Arab and Islamic Studies
Knightley (Strategy and Security Institute and College of Social Sciences and International Studies)
Laver (School of Geography, Archaeology and Earth Resources; IT Services), named after a former Chair of the University's Council
New Library
Newman Building
Old Library (Library, INTO, Hospitality Services)
Peter Chalk (Teaching and conference facilities), named after a former Chair of the University's Council
Physics tower
Queen's (School of Arts, Languages and Literature), named in honour of Queen Elizabeth II's visit to present the University with its founding charter
Reed Hall (formerly Streatham Hall) (staff catering, conference facilities), named after Alderman Reed, a former mayor of Exeter, who donated Streatham Hall in 1922. Streatham Hall's estate of around  included a valuable arboretum of rare and beautiful trees collected from around the world by the Veitch family.
Roborough (School of Arts, Languages and Literature), formerly Roborough Library. It was named after the first Lord Roborough, an early benefactor.
Streatham Court (School of Business and Economics)
Thornlea (School of Arts, Languages and Literature), contiguous with the campus but not strictly on it since there is no access to the building from the campus side.
Washington Singer (School of Psychology), named after Washington Singer, a generous donor to the University College of the South West of England at the beginning of the development of the Streatham Campus
Xfi Building (University of Exeter Business School), whose building was made possible by an anonymous donation

Students' Guild buildings
Cornwall House (Guild of Students)
Devonshire House (Guild of Students)

Miscellaneous
Innovation Centre
Northcote House (Administration) – Named after Stafford Northcote who started a school of art and science in what is now the Royal Albert Memorial Museum
Sports Hall
Streatham Farm (Buildings and Estates Division)
The Forum is a new £48 million centrepiece in the centre of the Streatham Campus. The mix of outside and inside space includes a new Student Services Centre, refurbished library, retail and catering outlets and learning spaces. Sir Robert McAlpine (builders of the O2 Arena and the Eden Project) was appointed as the main contractor for the project and began construction on campus in March 2010. The Forum was officially opened by Her Majesty the Queen on 2 May 2012.

The Northcott Theatre is also located on the Streatham Campus, but is independent of the University (although it has been known to be used for lectures).

Artwork
The campus also has several galleries, including the Bill Douglas Cinema Museum. There is also a Sculpture Walk, including pieces by Henry Moore, Barbara Hepworth and a statue to commemorate the events at Tiananmen Square.

External links
Images of The Forum on Streatham campus
The Grounds and Gardens of the University of Exeter
Map of the Streatham Campus
A Virtual Tour of the Streatham campus
School of Business and Economics
Xfi Centre for Finance and Investment

University of Exeter
Tourist attractions in Exeter